Yondonperenlein Baskhüü (born 1 October 1993) is a Mongolian judoka.

He won a bronze medal at the 2021 World Judo Championships. He competed in the men's 66 kg event at the 2020 Summer Olympics in Tokyo, Japan.

At the 2021 Judo Grand Slam Abu Dhabi held in Abu Dhabi, United Arab Emirates, he won one of the bronze medals in his event. He won the gold medal in his event at the 2022 Judo Grand Slam Paris held in Paris, France.

References

External links
 

1993 births
Living people
Mongolian male judoka
People from Zavkhan Province
Judoka at the 2020 Summer Olympics
Olympic judoka of Mongolia
20th-century Mongolian people
21st-century Mongolian people